Holland Casino is a Dutch state-owned company and has the legal monopoly on gambling in the Netherlands, and has fourteen casinos located throughout the country. Profits from Holland Casino go directly to the Dutch treasury. In 2007, profit was around 267 million euros and in 2006 some 263 million euros.

Casinos
The headquarters of Holland Casino is located in Hoofddorp, but in the future will move to a separate tower building of the new Holland Casino Utrecht. The first casino opened in Zandvoort on October 1, 1976. Since 2008, the Amsterdam casino is the largest branch. Other branches can be found at:
 Breda
 Eindhoven
 Enschede
 Groningen
 Leeuwarden
 Nijmegen
 Rotterdam
 Scheveningen
 Schiphol (Amsterdam Airport)
 Utrecht
 Valkenburg
 Venlo

Games
In the branches of Holland Casino the following casino games can be played (not all branches offer all of these games):
 French roulette
 American roulette
 Blackjack
 Caribbean Stud Poker
 Bingo
 Poker
 Sic Bo
 Punto Banco
 Money Wheel

Average payment rate was 93% at slot machines, while the legal minimum is 80%. The tables is the average payout ratio 97.7%. All gambling machines are supervised by Dutch Measurement Institute and they are also inspected by the independent inspection company Verispect.

Compulsive gambling
The company has policies in place to prevent compulsive gambling as much as possible. Holland Casino was presented the Gaming Award for the most socially responsible business in the international casino industry, on January 21, 2008, in London.

Reforms of 2011
In March 2011, the Dutch coalition government announced a new gambling framework which in 2015 will open the country's online gambling market (including casinos, lotteries, poker, sportsbooks and bingo) to licensed domestic and foreign gaming establishments.
The ultimate goal of the new Remote Gambling Act is to better protect the player while gambling online. Many online gamblers currently use foreign websites, so protection by the Dutch government is not guaranteed. The law should change this. The ultimate goal is to allow more than 80% of Dutch online gamblers to gamble legally in the Netherlands. Three different innovations have been set up by the Gaming Authority for this purpose.

References

External links

Casinos in the Netherlands
Government-owned companies of the Netherlands
Gambling companies established in 1974
1974 establishments in the Netherlands